Ligia Borowczyk (7 December 1932 – 6 September 2022) was a Polish actress.

Life and career
She made an appearance in the Chris Marker film La Jetée.

Borowczyk died in Warsaw on 6 September 2022, at the age of 89.

Filmography
 (1956)
 (1957)
 (1959)
La Jetée (1962)
Goto, Island of Love (1968)
Blanche (1971)
 (1971)
 (1978)

References

External links

1932 births
2022 deaths
Polish film actresses
People from Krasnystaw